Birkdale is a suburb of the contiguous Auckland metropolitan area located in New Zealand. It comprises statistical area units such as 'Birkdale North' and 'Birkdale South'. The suburb is located in the North Shore, and is under the governance of Auckland Council.

Demographics

Birkdale had a population of 8,898 at the 2018 New Zealand census, an increase of 561 people (6.7%) since the 2013 census, and an increase of 1,002 people (12.7%) since the 2006 census. There were 2,856 households, comprising 4,392 males and 4,506 females, giving a sex ratio of 0.97 males per female, with 1,932 people (21.7%) aged under 15 years, 1,956 (22.0%) aged 15 to 29, 4,242 (47.7%) aged 30 to 64, and 771 (8.7%) aged 65 or older.

Ethnicities were 65.2% European/Pākehā, 13.1% Māori, 9.7% Pacific peoples, 22.2% Asian, and 5.0% other ethnicities. People may identify with more than one ethnicity.

The percentage of people born overseas was 39.3, compared with 27.1% nationally.

Although some people chose not to answer the census's question about religious affiliation, 49.4% had no religion, 36.9% were Christian, 0.5% had Māori religious beliefs, 2.5% were Hindu, 2.0% were Muslim, 1.3% were Buddhist and 2.3% had other religions.

Of those at least 15 years old, 2,202 (31.6%) people had a bachelor's or higher degree, and 828 (11.9%) people had no formal qualifications. 1,455 people (20.9%) earned over $70,000 compared to 17.2% nationally. The employment status of those at least 15 was that 4,143 (59.5%) people were employed full-time, 906 (13.0%) were part-time, and 237 (3.4%) were unemployed.

Education
Birkenhead College is a secondary (years 9-13) school with a roll of  students. The school began as Birkdale College, opening in 1972. Notable alumni includes comedian Melanie Bracewell.

Birkdale Primary was established in 1894.

All of these schools are coeducational. Rolls are as of

Notes

External links
 Birkenhead College website
 Birkdale Intermediate website
 Birkdale Primary School website
 Birkdale North School website
 Photographs of Birkdale held in Auckland Libraries' heritage collections.

Suburbs of Auckland
North Shore, New Zealand
Kaipātiki Local Board Area